A lateral pontine syndrome is a lesion which is similar to the lateral medullary syndrome, but because it occurs in the pons, it also involves the cranial nerve nuclei of the pons.

Symptoms
Damage to the following areas produces symptoms (from medial to lateral):

Causes
It can be caused by an interruption to the blood supply of the anterior inferior cerebellar artery or circumferential arteries.

Treatment

References

External links 

Stroke
Syndromes affecting the nervous system